Pulsar planets are planets that are found orbiting pulsars, or rapidly rotating neutron stars. The first such planets to be discovered were around a millisecond pulsar and were the first extrasolar planets to be confirmed as discovered.

History
Pulsar planets are discovered through pulsar timing measurements, to detect anomalies in the pulsation period. Any bodies orbiting the pulsar will cause regular changes in its pulsation. Since pulsars normally rotate at near-constant speed, any changes can easily be detected with the help of precise timing measurements. The discovery of pulsar planets was unexpected; pulsars or neutron stars have previously gone supernova, and it was thought that any planets orbiting such stars would have been destroyed in the explosion.

In 1991, Andrew G. Lyne announced the first-ever pulsar planet discovered around PSR 1829–10. However, this was later retracted, just before the first real pulsar planets were announced.

In 1992, Aleksander Wolszczan and Dale Frail announced the discovery of a multi-planet planetary system around the millisecond pulsar PSR 1257+12. These were the first two extrasolar planets confirmed to be discovered, and thus the first multi-planet extrasolar planetary system discovered, and the first pulsar planets discovered. There was doubt concerning the discovery because of the retraction of the previous pulsar planet, and questions about how pulsars could have planets. However, the planets proved to be real. Two additional planets of lower mass were later discovered by the same technique, although one has since been retracted.

In 2000, the millisecond pulsar PSR B1620−26 was found to have a circumbinary planet (PSR B1620−26 b) that orbits both it and its companion white dwarf, WD B1620–26. This was announced as the oldest planet ever discovered, at 12.6 billion years old. It is currently believed to have originally been the planet of WD B1620–26 before becoming a circumbinary planet, and therefore, while discovered through the pulsar timing method, it did not form the way that PSR B1257+12's planets are thought to have.

The discovery was made by a team led by Deepto Chakrabarty of MIT using the Spitzer Space Telescope. The disk is thought to have formed from metal-rich debris left over from the supernova that formed the pulsar roughly 100,000 years ago and is similar to those seen around Sun-like stars, suggesting it may be capable of forming planets in a similar fashion. However, pulsar planets would be unlikely to harbor life as we know it, due to the high amounts of ionizing radiation and low amounts of visible light emitted by pulsars.

In 2011, a planet that is theorized to be the remaining core of a star that orbited a pulsar was announced. It orbits millisecond pulsar PSR J1719−1438, and represents a path to planetary status by evaporation of a star. The planet is estimated to have a density of at least 23 times that of water, a diameter of 55,000 km, a mass near that of Jupiter's, and a 2-hour, 10-minute orbital period at 600,000 km.

Formation
There are three types of pulsar planets known so far. The PSR B1257+12 planets were formed out of the debris of a merged companion star that used to orbit the pulsar when it was a white dwarf. In PSR J1719-1438, the planet most likely is the companion, or what's left of it after being almost entirely blasted away by the extreme irradiation from the nearby pulsar. PSR B1620–26 b is most likely a captured planet.

List of pulsar planets

Confirmed planets

Candidate planets

Protoplanetary disks (fallback disks)

Disproven planets

See also
 Habitability of neutron star systems
 Lists of exoplanets
 List of stars with proplyds
 Exoplanet
 Dale Frail
 Andrew Lyne
 Aleksander Wolszczan

References

Types of planet
Pulsars